Phaulosia is a monotypic moth genus in the subfamily Arctiinae erected by George Hampson in 1900. Its single species, Phaulosia sordida, was first described by Arthur Gardiner Butler in 1878. It is found in the Amazon region.

References

Lithosiini
Monotypic moth genera
Moths of South America